Leticia Magnani Hage (born ) is a Brazilian female volleyball player. She was part of the Brazil women's national volleyball team. 

She participated in the 2013 FIVB Volleyball World Grand Prix.
On club level she played for São Caetano E.C. in 2013.

Clubs
  São Caetano (2007–2011)
  Mackenzie EC (2011–2012)
  Praia Clube (2011–2015)
  E.C. Pinheiros (2015–2016)
  Fluminense FC (2016–)

References

External links
 Profile at FIVB.org

1990 births
Living people
Brazilian women's volleyball players
Place of birth missing (living people)
21st-century Brazilian women